(born July 19, 1979) is a former baseball player in Japan.  Asai primarily played with the Hanshin Tigers in the Central League.  He also played baseball for the Waikiki BeachBoys.

References

1979 births
Living people
Baseball people from Kanagawa Prefecture
Hosei University alumni
Japanese expatriate baseball players in the United States
Waikiki Beach Boys players
Nippon Professional Baseball outfielders
Hanshin Tigers players